John Alcott, BSC (27 November 1930 – 28 July 1986) was an English cinematographer known for his four collaborations with director Stanley Kubrick: 2001: A Space Odyssey (1968), for which he took over as lighting cameraman from Geoffrey Unsworth in mid-shoot, A Clockwork Orange (1971), Barry Lyndon (1975), the film for which he won his Oscar, and The Shining (1980). Alcott died from a heart attack in Cannes, France, in July 1986; he was 55. He received a tribute at the end of his last film No Way Out starring Kevin Costner.

Life
John Alcott was born in Isleworth, England, in 1930.

John's father was Arthur Alcott, a film executive. At a young age, Alcott started his career in film by becoming a clapper boy, which was the lowest position in the camera crew chain. As time progressed however, he moved his way up and eventually became the third highest position of the camera following the lighting cameraman and the main camera operator. His position was extremely important, as his job was to adjust, focus and measure the lens and distance between the actor or object being shot and the camera itself.

Alcott's big break was given to him by Stanley Kubrick, who was a master cinematographer, director, and producer. Kubrick promoted Alcott to lighting cameraman in 1968 while working on 2001: A Space Odyssey and from there the two created an inseparable collaboration, in which they worked together on more than one occasion. In 1971, Kubrick then elevated Alcott to director of photography on A Clockwork Orange which was nominated for four Academy Awards in Best Picture, Best Director, Best Adapted Screenplay and Best Film Editing; however, the film did not win in any category.

Alcott studied lighting and how the light fell in the rooms of a set. He would do this so that when he shot his work it would look like natural lighting, not stage lighting. It was this extra work and research that made his films look so visually beautiful.

Along with his Academy Award for Barry Lyndon, the film is considered to be one of the greatest and most beautiful movies made in terms of its visuals. Three films Alcott worked on were ranked between 1950–1997 in the top 20 of “Best Shot”, voted by the American Society of Cinematographers.

Not only was Alcott a highly regarded cinematographer, in the 1980s when he immigrated to the United States he directed and shot commercials for television at the well known Paisley Productions, based in Hollywood.

Death
While in Cannes, France, Alcott suffered a heart attack and died on 28 July 1986. In his memory and honour, the "BSC John Alcott ARRI Award" was created by the British Society of Cinematographers to honour fellow lighting cameramen in film. Alcott was survived by his wife Sue and son Gavin, who followed in his father's footsteps.

Filmography 
2001: A Space Odyssey (1968)
A Clockwork Orange (1971)
Little Malcolm (1974)
Overlord (1975)
Barry Lyndon (1975)
March or Die (1977)
The Disappearance (1977)
Who Is Killing the Great Chefs of Europe? (1978)
The Shining (1980)
Terror Train (1980)
Fangio – Una vita a 300 all'ora (1981)
Fort Apache the Bronx (1981)
Triumphs of a Man Called Horse (1982)
Vice Squad (1982)
The Beastmaster (1982)
Under Fire (1983)
Greystoke: The Legend of Tarzan, Lord of the Apes (1984)
Baby: Secret of the Lost Legend (1985)
Miracles (1986)
White Water Summer (1987)
No Way Out (1987)

Awards
 1973: BAFTA Award nomination for A Clockwork Orange
 1976: Oscar for Barry Lyndon
 1976: BAFTA Award for Barry Lyndon
 1984: BAFTA Award nomination for Greystoke

References

External links
 John Alcott biography and credits at BFI Screenonline
 

1930 births
1986 deaths
English cinematographers
People from Isleworth
Best Cinematographer Academy Award winners
Best Cinematography BAFTA Award winners